Église du Saint-Esprit may refer to:
Église du Saint-Esprit (Paris), France
Église du Saint-Esprit (Aix-en-Provence), France
Église Saint-Esprit-de-Rosemont, Montreal, Canada
Basilique-Cathédrale Saint-Esprit, Istanbul, Turkey